Joaquim Fernandes da Silva (1 June 1926 – 25 February 2009) was a Portuguese footballer who played as defender.

He represented Benfica during 9 seasons, making over 220 appearances for them and winning 6 major titles, including the  Latin Cup.

Career
Born in Lisbon, Fernandes joined Benfica youth academy at age 17. He graduated in 1945, but only made his debut on 9 June 1946, in the 3–2 loss against Atlético CP for the quarter-finals of the Taça de Portugal. The following season, he started alongside Félix Antunes, and went to play 227 times for Benfica in the following eight years, winning one league title in 1949–50 and four Taças de Portugal. Fernandes only goal came on 7 March 1954, in a 5–0 win over Oriental.

Honours
Benfica
Primeira Divisão: 1949–50
Taça de Portugal: 1948–49, 1950–51, 1951–52, 1952–53
Latin Cup: 1949–50

References
General
 

Specific

External links
 

1926 births
2009 deaths
Footballers from Lisbon
Portuguese footballers
S.L. Benfica footballers
S.C.U. Torreense players
Primeira Liga players
Association football defenders